Bonnybridge Central railway station served the village of Bonnybridge, Falkirk, Scotland from 1888 to 1935 on the Kilsyth and Bonnybridge Railway.

History 
The station opened on 2 July 1888 by the Kilsyth and Bonnybridge Railway. The goods yard was on the east side and the signal box was to the east. A locomotive shed called Bonnybridge Shed was north west. It had a single road and a turntable. The signal box was replaced in 1896. The station closed on 1 February 1935.

References

External links 

Disused railway stations in Falkirk (council area)
Railway stations in Great Britain opened in 1888
Railway stations in Great Britain closed in 1935
1888 establishments in Scotland
1935 disestablishments in Scotland